Amir Aliakbari (born 11 December 1987) is an Iranian mixed martial artist signed to ONE Championship, where he competes in the Heavyweight division. He has also competed for Absolute Championship Berkut (ACB) and Rizin Fighting Federation. 

Aliakbari is also a former gold medalist and world champion in Greco-Roman wrestling, winning gold medals at the 2010 World Wrestling Championships and 2009 Asian Wrestling Championships. International Wrestling Federation FILA banned Aliakbari from competing for life after a second doping offense.

Wrestling career 
In 2007–2008, Aliakbari wrestled for Melli Haffari Company Ahvaz Sports Club of the Iranian Premier Wrestling League.

Aliakbari missed the 2012 Summer Olympics due to a doping suspension.

In the 2013 World Wrestling Championships, 120 kg he initially won a gold medal, making him a two-time world champion. However, in December 2013, International Wrestling Federation, FILA banned Aliakbari for life after a second doping offence. He was stripped of his gold medal and Heiki Nabi was moved up to gold.

Mixed martial arts career

Early career 

In 2014, longtime MMA entrepreneur Mishal Abul personally found Aliakbari and got him into MMA. Abul was an investor with Paradigm Sports Management, so Aliakbari signed a management agreement with them. At the same time, he signed on to train under UFC star Mike Swick of AKA Thailand in Phuket, Thailand, also training alongside UFC fighters Mark Hunt and Soa Palelei. Aliakbari is the first world class Iranian wrestler to pursue an MMA career.

Early MMA career
Aliakbari made his professional MMA debut in October 2015, defeating Hyung Chul-Lee via TKO in the first round. His second bout came two months later as he defeated Radu Spinghel via TKO in the first round.

Rizin Fighting Federation
In early 2016, it was announced that Aliakbari had signed with the Japanese promotion Rizin Fighting Federation. He made his debut in September in the first round of the Openweight Grand Prix against Joao Isidoro Almeida. He won the fight via TKO in the first round. Aliakbari was scheduled to face former UFC champion Shane Carwin in the quarter-finals in December 2016. However, Carwin withdrew from the tournament and he instead faced Heath Herring. Aliakbari won the bout by unanimous decision. In the final stage of the tournament on December 31, Aliakbari faced Valentin Moldavsky. He won the fight via split decision. He then faced Mirko Cro Cop in the finals on the same night and lost the fight via knockout. He then defeated Geronimo dos Santos and Tyler King via TKO.

Absolute Championship Berkut 
In December 2017 Aliakbari announced his departure from Rizin and his joining of ACB. His first opponent was Denis Smoldarev, whom Aliakbari defeated via technical knockout at 2:27 of the first round on March 24, 2018.  He was set to have four opponents in ACB.

Ultimate Fighting Championship
It was reported that Aliakbari was signed by the UFC on June 6, 2019 after he offered compensation to the ACA for early termination of his contract, where the compensation sum was donated to charity. He withdrew from the UFC due to a doping ban handed down by the international amateur wrestling governing body, as well as US sanctions.

ONE Championship
In August 2020 news broke that Aliakbari had signed with the ONE Championship. He was scheduled to make his promotional debut against Islam Abasov at ONE Championship: Big Bang on December 4, 2020. However, Abasov withdrew from the fight after being detained following a road incident in his native Russia.

Aliakbari faced Kang Ji Won at ONE Championship: Fists of Fury 2 on March 5, 2021. In a huge upset, Aliakbari lost to Kang by first-round knockout.

Aliakbari faced Anatoly Malykhin at ONE Championship: Revolution on September 24, 2021. He lost the bout, getting knocked unconscious again in the first round.

Aliakbari faced Mauro Cerilli at ONE on Prime Video 1 on August 27, 2022. He won the fight via technical knockout in the second round, earning his first promotional victory.

Aliakbari faced the former ONE Heavyweight World Champion Brandon Vera on December 3, 2022, at ONE 164. He won the fight by a first-round technical knockout.

Mixed martial arts record

|-
|Win
|align=center|12–3
|Brandon Vera
|TKO (elbows and punches)
|ONE 164
|
|align=center|1
|align=center|3:37
|Pasay, Philippines
|
|-
|Win
|align=center|11–3
|Mauro Cerilli
|TKO (elbows)
|ONE on Prime Video 1
|
|align=center|2
|align=center|4.02
|Kallang, Singapore
|
|-
| Loss
| align=center|10–3
| Anatoly Malykhin 
| KO (punches)
|ONE: Revolution
|
|align=center|1	
|align=center|2:57 
|Kallang, Singapore
|
|-
| Loss
| align=center|10–2
| Kang Ji Won 
| KO (punches)
| ONE: Fists Of Fury 2
| 
| align=center|1
| align=center|1:54
| Kallang, Singapore
| 
|-
| Win
|align=center| 10–1
|Shelton Graves
|TKO (punches)
|ACA 93: Balaev vs. Zhamaldaev
|
|align=center|1
|align=center|4:44
|Saint Petersburg, Russia
|
|-
| Win
|align=center| 9–1
|Daniel Omielańczuk
|Decision (unanimous)
|ACB 89: Abdulvakhabov vs. Bagov 3
|
|align=center|3
|align=center|5:00
|Krasnodar, Russia
|
|-
| Win
|align=center| 8–1
|Denis Smoldarev
|TKO (elbows and punches)
|ACB 83: Borisov vs. Kerimov
|
|align=center|1
|align=center|2:25
|Baku, Azerbaijan
|
|-
| Win
|align=center| 7–1
|Tyler King
|TKO (punches)
|Rizin Fighting World Grand Prix 2017 Opening Round Part 1
|
|align=center|1
|align=center|1:39
|Saitama, Japan
|
|-
| Win
|align=center| 6–1
|Gerônimo dos Santos
|TKO (punches)
|Rizin FF 5: Sakura
|
|align=center|1
|align=center|3:34
|Yokohama, Japan
|
|-
| Loss
| align=center|5–1
| Mirko Cro Cop
| KO (punches)
| Rizin World Grand-Prix 2016: Final Round
| 
| align=center|1
| align=center|2:03
| Saitama, Japan
| 
|-
| Win
| align=center|5–0
| Valentin Moldavsky
| Decision (split)
| Rizin World Grand-Prix 2016: Final Round
| 
| align=center|2
| align=center|5:00
| Saitama, Japan
| 
|-
|  Win
| align=center | 4–0
| Heath Herring
| Decision (unanimous)
| Rizin World Grand-Prix 2016: 2nd Round
| 
| align=center | 2
| align=center | 5:00
| Saitama, Japan
| 
|-
| Win
| align=center | 3–0
| João Isidoro Almeida
| TKO (punches)
| Rizin World Grand-Prix 2016: 1st Round
| 
| align=center | 1
| align=center | 2:25
| Saitama, Japan
| 
|-
| Win
| align=center | 2–0
| Radu Spinghel
| TKO (punches)
| Real Fight Championship 3
| 
| align=center | 1
| align=center | 1:02
| Yokohama, Japan
|
|-
| Win
| align=center | 1–0
| Hyung Chul-Lee
| TKO (punches)
| Full Metal Dojo 7: Full Metal Massacre
| 
| align=center | 1
| align=center | 0:17
| Bangkok, Thailand
|
|-

Greco-Roman results

! colspan="8" | World Championships matches
|-
! Res.
! Record
! Opponent
! Score
! Date
! Event
! Location
! Notes
|-
! style=background:white colspan=9 | 
|-
| Win
| 14–1
| align=left |  Heiki Nabi
| 4–0
| 2013-09-16
| 2013 World Wrestling Championships
| style="text-align:left;" |  Budapest, Hungary
| style="text-align:left;" | 
|-
| Win
| 13–1
| align=left |  Riza Kayaalp
| 4–1
| 2013-09-16
| 2013 World Wrestling Championships
|  Budapest, Hungary
| style="text-align:left;" | 
|-
| Win
| 12–1
| align=left |  Eduard Popp
| 7–0
| 2013-09-16
| 2013 World Wrestling Championships
| style="text-align:left;" |  Budapest, Hungary
| style="text-align:left;" | 
|-
| Win
| 11–1
| align=left |  Johan Euren
| 7–0
| 2013-09-16
| 2013 World Wrestling Championships
| style="text-align:left;" |  Budapest, Hungary
| style="text-align:left;" | 
|-
| Win
| 10–1
| align=left |  Oleksandr Chernetskyi
| 3–1F
| 2013-09-16
| 2013 World Wrestling Championships
| style="text-align:left;" |  Budapest, Hungary
| style="text-align:left;" | 
|-
! style=background:white colspan=9 | 
|-
| Win
| 9–1
| align=left |  Tsimafai Dzeinichenka
| 2–2, 1–0
| 2010-09-06
| 2010 World Wrestling Championships
| style="text-align:left;" |  Moscow, Russia
| style="text-align:left;" | 
|-
| Win
| 8–1
| align=left |  Aslanbek Khushtov
| 1–0, 1–0
| 2010-09-06
| 2010 World Wrestling Championships
| style="text-align:left;" |  Moscow, Russia
| style="text-align:left;" | 
|-
| Win
| 7–1
| align=left |  Kaloyan Dinchev
| 3–0, 1–0
| 2010-09-06
| 2010 World Wrestling Championships
| style="text-align:left;" |  Moscow, Russia
| style="text-align:left;" | 
|-
| Win
| 6–1
| align=left |  Mohamed Abdelfatah
| 1–0, 1–0
| 2010-09-06
| 2010 World Wrestling Championships
| style="text-align:left;" |  Moscow, Russia
| style="text-align:left;" | 
|-
| Win
| 5–1
| align=left |  Davyd Saldadze
| 1–0, 1–0
| 2010-09-06
| 2010 World Wrestling Championships
| style="text-align:left;" |  Moscow, Russia
| style="text-align:left;" | 
|-
! style=background:white colspan=9 | 
|-
| Win
| 4–1
| align=left |  Davyd Saldadze
| 1–0, 2–2
| 2009-09-26
| 2009 World Wrestling Championships
| style="text-align:left;" |  Herning, Denmark
| style="text-align:left;" | 
|-
| Loss
| 3–1
| align=left |  Balázs Kiss
| 1–0, 0–5, 0–1
| 2009-09-26
| 2009 World Wrestling Championships
| style="text-align:left;" |  Herning, Denmark
| style="text-align:left;" | 
|-
| Win
| 3–0
| align=left |  Alin Alexuc-Ciurariu
| 2–0, 1–0
| 2009-09-26
| 2009 World Wrestling Championships
| style="text-align:left;" |  Herning, Denmark
| style="text-align:left;" | 
|-
| Win
| 2–0
| align=left |  Kaloyan Dinchev
| 3–0, 3–0
| 2009-09-26
| 2009 World Wrestling Championships
| style="text-align:left;" |  Herning, Denmark
| style="text-align:left;" | 
|-
| Win
| 1–0
| align=left |  Jesper Viholt
| 5–0, 4–0
| 2009-09-26
| 2009 World Wrestling Championships
| style="text-align:left;" |  Herning, Denmark
| style="text-align:left;" | 
|-

References

External links
 
 

1987 births
Living people
Iranian male sport wrestlers
Iranian sportspeople in doping cases
Wrestlers at the 2010 Asian Games
Iranian male mixed martial artists
Melli Haffari club sportspeople
Sportspeople banned for life
Islamic Azad University alumni
Doping cases in wrestling
World Wrestling Championships medalists
World Wrestling Champions
Universiade medalists in wrestling
Universiade silver medalists for Iran
Heavyweight mixed martial artists
Mixed martial artists utilizing Greco-Roman wrestling
Asian Games competitors for Iran
Medalists at the 2013 Summer Universiade
21st-century Iranian people